Osei Kofi is a retired Ghanaian footballer. He played for Asante Kotoko S.C. and the Ghana national football team. He was a joint top scorer in the 1965 Africa Cup of Nations tournament held in Tunis, Tunisia leading to Ghana winning the tournament for a second time. He was joint top goalscorer in 1965 Africa Cup of Nations and he was the third highest scorer in the 1968 Africa Cup of Nations. Osei Kofi was called the 'wizard dribbler' because of his ball dribbling skills.

Osei Kofi apparently turned down a financial incentive to play in Europe at his prime in 1969. He later became a priest.

He has also worked as the National Coordinator for National Games.

Honours
Ghana
Africa Cup of Nations winner: 1963, 1965

Asante Kotoko
Ghana Premier League winner: 1964, 1965, 1967

References

External links
Video interview on BBC TV
BBC website

1940 births
Living people
Association football forwards
Ghanaian footballers
Ghana international footballers
1965 African Cup of Nations players
1968 African Cup of Nations players
Olympic footballers of Ghana
Footballers at the 1964 Summer Olympics
Footballers at the 1968 Summer Olympics
Footballers at the 1972 Summer Olympics
Asante Kotoko S.C. players
Africa Cup of Nations-winning players